Jordaan may refer to:

Places
Jordaan, a neighbourhood in the city of Amsterdam, Netherlands, part of the borough of Amsterdam-Centrum
Johnny Jordaan Square (Johnny Jordaanplein) a square in the city of Amsterdam

Persons
Given name
Jordaan Brown (born 1992), Jamaican football player
Jordaan Clarke, part of a key case Clarke v. Oregon Health & Sciences University

Surname
Andrew Jordaan, South African cricketer
Arno Jordaan, South African Afrikaans singer and songwriter
Danny Jordaan (born 1951), president of the South African Football Association (SAFA), lecturer, politician and anti-apartheid activist
Henno Jordaan (born 1988), South African cricketer
Johnny Jordaan, artistic name for Johannes Hendricus van Musscher (1924–1989), Dutch singer of popular music, in particular the genre known as levenslied
Paul Jordaan (born 1992), South African rugby union player
Theuns Jordaan (1971–2021), South African singer and songwriter
Zandré Jordaan (born 1987), South African rugby union player

Others
Jordaan v Verwey, an important case in the South African law of lease

See also
Jordan (disambiguation)